The 1920–21 Northern Rugby Football Union season was the 26th season of rugby league football.

Season summary
Hull F.C. won their second ever Championship in as many seasons when they defeated local rivals Hull Kingston Rovers 16-14 in the Championship play-off.

Hull Kingston Rovers had ended the regular season as league leaders.

Leigh won the Challenge Cup beating Halifax 13-0 in the final.

Jim Kennedy of Hull F.C. set a club record of 14 goals scored in a match against Rochdale Hornets on 7 April 1921. On the 29 January 1921 he had also scored a club record 36 points (4 tries and 12 goals) in a single match against Keighley.

Wigan won the Lancashire League, and Halifax won the Yorkshire League. Broughton Rangers beat Leigh 6–3 to win the Lancashire Cup, and Hull Kingston Rovers beat Hull F.C. 2–0 to win the Yorkshire County Cup.

Championship

Championship play-off

Challenge Cup

Leigh defeated Halifax 13-0 in the final played at Broughton in front of a crowd of 25,000. 

This was Leigh’s first Challenge Cup Final win in their first final appearance.

Sources
1920-21 Rugby Football League season at wigan.rlfans.com

References

1920 in English rugby league
1921 in English rugby league
Northern Rugby Football Union seasons